Ligurotettix is a genus of clicker grasshoppers in the family Acrididae. There are at least two described species in Ligurotettix.

Species
These two species belong to the genus Ligurotettix:
 Ligurotettix coquilletti McNeill, 1897 (desert clicker grasshopper)
 Ligurotettix planum (Bruner, 1904) (Pecos clicker grasshopper)

References

Further reading

External links

 

Acrididae
Articles created by Qbugbot